Charles Dumazer (born January 10, 1991), professionally known as C-Sick , is a Grammy-nominated French-American record producer from Chicago, Illinois. He participated in his first beat battle at the age of 17 and became the 2008 Chicago Big Tune Beat Battle champion. C-Sick had the chance to go and move on to the National Finals in New York City to prove to his audience his ability of becoming a music producer. C-Sick has produced music for artists such as Nas, Logic, Meek Mill, Tory Lanez, Fabolous, G Herbo, and many others. C-Sick's versatility has earned him multiple platinum records and placements on the Billboard Hot 100.

Early life
Born in France, C-Sick moved to Chicago when he was nine, and grew up on the south east side of Chicago, Illinois, better known as the 'East Side'. By the age of 15, without any formal musical training, he started using FL Studio (formerly Fruity Loops) beat-making program. He started by creating juke and footwork tracks and decided to sample and create hip hop beats after listening to Kanye West's song "Through the Wire" on the radio. At the age of 17, he became the 2008 Red Bull Big Tune Beat Battle National Champion and produced the song "Film" for legendary Hip Hop artist Nas. He currently uses FL Studio 7 to make beats. C-Sick was influenced by producers such as Just Blaze, and Kanye West.

Grammy Awards 
The Grammy Awards are awarded annually by the National Academy of Recording Arts and Sciences. C-Sick has landed his very first nomination for his work on Championships (Meek Mill).

|-
|rowspan="1"|2019
|rowspan="1"|Championships (Meek Mill)
|rowspan="2"|Best Rap Album
|

2022

Tory Lanez – Sorry 4 What
 11. "No More Parties in LA"

G Herbo – Survivor's Remorse 
 01. "Sleepless Nights"
 03. "Change (Gun Shots)"
 09. "It's Something In Me"
 10. "Him"

2021

Lil Reese – Supa Savage 3
 03. "Show Us Some" (feat. Young Dolph)
 04. "Make A Move"
 10. "Wassup"

Rooga – Scrappers
 05. "Get You Whacked" (feat. Lil Moe 6Blocka)

2020

Tory Lanez – The New Toronto 3
 06. "Accidents Happen" (feat. Lil Tjay)
 13. "Letter To The City 2"

G Herbo – PTSD 
 14. "Intuition"

2019

G Herbo – Sessions 
 06. "Sessions"

Juice Wrld 
 00. "Right Now"

King L 
 00. "Tesla"

Lil Reese 

 01. "GetBackMood (Pt. 2)"

YBN Almighty Jay 
 01. "Let Me Breathe"

2018

Meek Mill – Championships 
 16. "Wit The Shits"

Tory Lanez – Love Me Now? 
 01. "Why Don't You love Me?"

King L 
 00. "Just Relax"

C Dot Honcho – Head Honcho 
 03. "Invalid"

Louis Farrakhan – Let's Change The World 
 00. "I'll Fight Ya" (feat. Rick Ross, Snoop Dogg & Common)

Blac Chyna 
 00. "Deserve" (feat. Yo Gotti & Jeremih)

2017

Tory Lanez – Memories Don't Die 

 03. "Shooters"
 07. "Real Thing" (feat. Future)

Fabolous – Friday on Elm Street (with Jadakiss) 

 05. "Soul Food"

Meek Mill – RGB 

 01. "King"

Logic – Everybody 

 08. "Mos Definitely"

G Herbo – Humble Beast 

 12. "Red Snow"
 00. "Rain"

Tory Lanez – "The New Toronto 2" 

 02. "Bal Harbour" (feat. A$AP Ferg)
 03. "DopeMan Go"
 05. "LICK x Drive You Crazy" (Produced with Play Picasso & EC Fresco)
 06. "Dancin'" (Produced with Play Picasso)
 07. "New Year / $auce Baby" (Produced with Play Picasso)
 11. "Anyway"

Tory Lanez – "Chixtape 4" 

 12. "Aaliyah" (Produced with Play Picasso)

2016

Meek Mill – DC4 

 01. "Pray For Em"

Lil Durk – "300 Days 300 Nights" 

 04. "Trap House" (feat. Young Thug & Young Dolph)

Lil Durk – "They Forgot" 

 03. "Too Late"
 08. "We Dem Niggas" (feat. Mozzy & OTF lkey)

Young Scooter – "Street Lottery 3" 

 01. "Doin' Numbers"

Tory Lanez – "Fargo Fridays" 

 01. "Tim Duncan"
 02. "I Want You" (feat. Spenzo)
 03. "Diamonds"

Tink – Winter's Diary 4 
 06. "Stay On It" (feat. Lil Durk)

Lil Herb – "Strictly 4 My Fans" 

 01. Strictly 4 My Fans (Intro)" (produced with DJ L)
 08. "Been Havin"
 11. "Jay-Z (Outro)" (produced with DJ L)

Chance The Rapper (with Jeremih) – Merry Christmas Lil' Mama 

 03. "Stranger at the Table" (Produced with Bongo the Drum Gahd)
 09. "Merry Christmas Lil' Mama" (Produced with Peter Cottontale & DJ Spinn)

2015

Lil Bibby 
 01. "Better Dayz" (featuring Lil Herb)

King L – Drilluminati 3 
 09. "Where I Come From"

Chance The Rapper – Surf (with Donnie Trumpet & The Social Experiment) 
 03. "Warm Enough" (featuring J. Cole & Noname Gypsy)
 06. "Windows" (featuring BJ the Chicago Kid & Raury)

Lil Durk – Remember My Name 
 01. "500 Homicides"

Zona Man – No Advance 
 03. "Mean To Me" (feat. Future and Lil Durk)
 08. "Pounds in The Town"
 09. "Run Up On Me"

Tink – Winter's Diary 3 
 01. "I Like"

Lil Herb – Ballin Like I'm Kobe 
 01. "L's"
 10. "Don't Worry" (Feat. Lil Bibby)

Logic – The Incredible True Story 
 15. "Never Been"
 16. "Run It"

Lil Bibby – Free Crack 3 
 09. "If He Finds Out" (feat. Tink and Jacquees)
 11. "Came From Nothing"

Lil Durk – 300 Days 300 Nights 

 01. "Intro"
 02. "Gunz N' Money"
 04. "Waffle House" (feat. Young Dolph)
 05. "This Case" (feat. Hypno Carlito)
 06. "My Beyonce" (feat. Dej Loaf)
 10. "Spent Me" (feat. Meek Mill)
 12. "Jump Off"
 18. "Ride 4 Me"
 Bonus: Zona Man "Mean To Me" (feat. Future and Lil Durk)

Tory Lanez – The New Toronto 
 11. "Letter To The City"

Alkpote & :fr:Butter Bullets – "Ténébreuse Musique" 
 07. "No Limit" (feat. Hamza)

Young Gii – "Islands To The City" 
 02. "That Ain't Enough"
 04. "Coldest Summer 1"

2014

Lil Herb – Welcome-To-Fazoland 
 07. "Mamma I'm Sorry"

Yung Berg 
 00. "I'm On" (featuring King Los)

Stunt Taylor – StuntN On Turbo 
 00. "1 Nite" 
 03. "Flee Amigo" (featuring King L)
 04. "Meet Me" 
 08. "Friend Of Me"  (featuring Chief Keef & Twista)
 09. "Pussy Nigga"
 10. "Understand"
 11. "Walking Testimony"

King L – Tony 
 11. "Fuck Nigga"
 14. "Would You Believe It"
 00. "Fuck You" (Bonus)
 00. "Give You That" (Bonus)

Lil Durk – Signed To The Streets 2 
 04. "Rumors"

Twista – Dark Horse 
 01. "Friend Of Me"  (featuring Chief Keef & Stunt Taylor)

Lil Herb – Ballin Like I'm Kobe 
 01. "Frankie Lymon"

King L 
 00. "Fashion" (featuring Katie Got Bandz)

Fabolous – The Young OG Project 
 08. "Rap & Sex"

Young Scooter – Jug Season 
 02. "Cocaina Mota"

2013

Fredo Santana – Fredo Kruger 
 04. "Up Them Poles" (featuring Ballout)

YP – Wide Awake 
 02. "To The Sea"
 03. "Blow My High"
 05. "Rub A Dub"  (featuring King L)
 07. "Bad Bitches"  (featuring Lyriq)
 08. "Smoke Something"  (featuring Rockie Fresh)
 12. "All Day"

Logic – Young Sinatra: Welcome To Forever 
 04. "5AM"
 05. "Break It Down" (feat. Jhené Aiko)
 09. "Walk On By"
 17. "Common Logic"
 20. "The End" (co-produced with Kevin Randolph)

YP – Restless 
 02. "Softly"
 07. "Another Round"
 08. "Hip-Hop"  (featuring Mikkey Halsted)
 10. "High"
 12. "Much Talkin"  (featuring Lyriq)
 13. "Rubberbands"
 15. "Do It Like I Do"  (featuring Lil Bibby)

Lil Twist feat. Miley Cyrus & Justin Bieber 
 00. "Twerk"

Logic 
00. "Two Kings" (feat. King Chip)

2012

King L – The Motion Pictures 
 01. "Bars"
 20. "Get Off My Dick"

Sir Michael Rocks – The Grow Op: Official 4/20 Mixtape 
 03. "We Get High"

Logic – Young Sinatra: Undeniable 
 03. "Dead Presidents III"
 12. "We Get High"

Sonnie Carson – Flight #2012 
 07. "We Own The Night" (featuring Jim Jones)

Fredo Santana – It's A Scary Sight 
 01. "WAR" (featuring SD)

King L – Showtime 
 02. "Showtime"

King L – Dope & Shrimp 
 01. "Val Venis"
 02. "Val Venis (Remix)" (featuring Jeremih)

Fabolous – The S.O.U.L. Tape 2 
 04. "We Get High"

2010

GLC 
 01. "G On His Dollarz"

Skyzoo – The Great Debater 
 09. "Until It All Goes"

2009

Nas 
 01. "Film"

Businesspeople from Chicago
1991 births
Living people
Place of birth missing (living people)
French emigrants to the United States
Hip hop record producers
Midwest hip hop musicians
Musicians from Chicago